Tagaev, also Tagayev (masculine, Cyrillic Тагаев) or Tagaeva (feminine, Cyrillic Тагаева) is a surname of Turkic origin. The surname is slavicised from Tagai and literally means Tagai's.

People with the surname
 Abdoujapar Tagaev (1953-2017), Kyrgyzstani politician
 Bobirjon Tagaev (born 1993), Uzbekistani Muaythai practitioner
  (born 1940), Kyrgyzstani composer, People's Artist of Kyrgyzstan
 Magomed Tagaev (born 1948), ideologist of Dagestani separatists
 Murataly Tagaev (born 1978), Kyrgyzstani politician
 Elman Tagaýew (born 1989), Turkmen footballer
 Ramazan Tagaev, fictional character from the film

Further reading 
 Тагаевы. Сборник фамильных преданий Осетии

See also 
Tagaevo

Surnames of Turkish origin
Bashkir-language surnames
Kazakh-language surnames
Tajik-language surnames
Tatar-language surnames
Uzbek-language surnames